The H.A.I. Goonetileke Prize for Literary Translation is a bi-annual literary prize in Sri Lanka. It is awarded by the Gratiaen Trust, which also awards the Gratiaen Prize, for the translation of Sinhala or Tamil language creative writing into English. It was established in 2003.

Michael Ondaatje, who initiated the Gratiaen Prize, had also wanted to promote Sri Lankan writing in the local languages to an international audience. He had also hoped it would foster cross-cultural understanding amongst the various ethnic groups within the country.

The prize is named after his friend Henry Alfred Ian Goonetileke, the first chairperson of the Gratiaen Prize, former Director of the University of Peradeniya library, and bibliographer.

The award is open to Sri Lankan authors who are resident in the country. In 2019, the monetary award was Rs 200,000.

Winners

References 

Sri Lankan literary awards
Awards established in 2003
Translation awards
2003 establishments in Sri Lanka